Thomas Henry Macpherson (June 1, 1842 – June 17, 1903) was a Scottish-born merchant and political figure in Ontario, Canada. He represented Hamilton in the House of Commons of Canada from 1896 to 1900 as a Liberal.

He was born in Perth. Macpherson was employed at a banking house in England and came to Ontario in 1871. He became the senior member of a wholesale grocery in Hamilton. Macpherson served as president of the Hamilton Board of Trade.

References 

Members of the House of Commons of Canada from Ontario
Liberal Party of Canada MPs
1842 births
1903 deaths